Leon Žlebnik (29 January 1918, Materija - 7 September 2004, Ljubljana) was a Slovenian philosopher, pedagogue, and psychologist.

Works 
Obča zgodovina pedagogike. 1955 (albanian Prishtina 1959, 1964) 
Ljudje med seboj, I & II (1955), 
Izbrani teksti pedagoških klasikov (1956),  
Psihologija otroka in mladostnika I (1960) & II (1963),
Da bi se bolje razumeli (1963), 
Vajino ljubezensko zorenje (1966), 
Vzgoja in izobraževanje (1980).

See also 
 Pedagogy
 History of Education
 University of Ljubljana

References 

1918 births
2004 deaths
20th-century Slovenian philosophers
Slovenian educational theorists
Slovenian psychologists
People from the Municipality of Hrpelje-Kozina
20th-century psychologists
21st-century Slovenian philosophers